The Marine Region is a branch of the Hong Kong Police Force, more widely known as the Marine Police. The marine police patrol  of waters within the territory of Hong Kong, including 263 islands. The Marine Region with about 3,000 officers, and a fleet of 142 in total, made up of 70 launches and 72 craft is the largest of any civil police force.

Overview 

The Marine Region involves about 3,000 officers policing some 13,000 local craft and a total maritime population of 14,100. In addition to normal marine policing functions, the marine police are also responsible for countering illegal immigration and smuggling at sea.

To undertake this work, the Marine Region additionally mount shore patrol to police the smaller islands and isolated communities with no land transport to other parts of the territory, and participate in the Hong Kong Maritime Rescue Co-ordination Centre, which is responsible for co-ordinating maritime rescue operations both within and outside Hong Kong waters. The region's headquarters are located at Sai Wan Ho.

Since 2007, the Marine Region has developed a new, two-part operational strategy called Versatile Maritime Policing Response (VMPR) which has come into operation in phases, providing an improved police service at reduced cost with an enhanced Command and Control System and faster craft offering a more flexible policing response.

Organisation
The Marine Region comprises a Regional Headquarters and two sea Districts. The entire region is commanded by a Regional Commander with the rank of Assistant Commissioner, who is assisted by a Chief Superintendent. Each of the three bureaux is commanded by a Senior Superintendent; divisions and units are commanded by Superintendents, who are assisted by Chief Inspectors.

The Region comprises:
 Operations Bureau is responsible for all operational matters at Regional level, including:
 Operations Division
 Regional Crime Units investigating crimes and syndicated illegal immigration by sea;
 RCCC;
 Logistics Unit;
 Regional Motor Transport Office;
 Regional Armoury;
 Small Boat Division.
 Crime Marine
Administration Bureau is responsible for general administration; personnel and establishment matters.
Support Bureau is responsible for:
 management of the launch acquisition programmes;
 training and assessment of Marine police personnel in navigation, seamanship, engineering, and safety; and
 selection and acquisition of specialist equipment.
 core property strategy in Marine Region

Headquarters 

The Marine Region had its headquarters at the Former Marine Police Headquarters Compound in Tsim Sha Tsui until 1996, when they were relocated to Sai Wan Ho. The old headquarters have now become a heritage tourism facility known as 1881 Heritage.

Gallery

Fleet
Marine craft
 BSC Marine Group patrol vessels
  Protector (Pacific Forum) class – 6 small patrol boats
  Hong Kong Shipyards Sea Panther-class large command boat 1988 – 2 large command boats
 replaced Hong Kong United Dockyard Sea Lion class command boats 1965 – 2 (retired 1993)
 Damen Stan Mk I patrol boats 1980–1981 – 10 built by Chung Wah Shipyard 1990s
 Damen Stan Mk III patrol boats 1984–1985 – 16 built by Chung Wah Shipyard 1990s
 Damen Stan 2600 patrol boats
 HamiltonJet 13m Aluminium patrol boats
  ASC Keka Class 30-metre patrol launches 2000 – six built by Cheoy Lee Shipyard
 replaced six Damen Class Mk1 patrol launches
Rigid inflatable hull vessels
Tai Fei – fast patrol vessels
speed boats

Historic
 22' Police Launch 1970 – 11
 30' Fairey Marine Spear Class patrol boat 1981 – 9
 40' Jetstream Class patrol craft 1971 – 3
 45' converted tugs pre-1995 – 8
 45' converted tugs pre-1975 – 2
 Islander Class patrol craft 1960 – 1
 Hong Kong United Dockyard Sea Rover Class patrol craft 1955 – 6
 Pacific Forum Class Patrol boat 1993 – 6
 78' Vosper Thornycroft coastal patrol craft 1972–73 – 7 (retired 1993)

Firearms
Smith & Wesson Model 10- Standard issue sidearm for Marine Region (except Small Boat Division), 6 shot .38 revolver.
Glock 17- Standard issue pistol for Small Boat Division, loaded with 17 round of 9mm Parabellum magazines
Federal Model 201-Z Riot Gun – Standard issue anti-riot gun, loaded with less-than-lethal CS rounds.
Heckler & Koch MP5- Standard issue SMG, loaded with 30 round of 9mm Parabellum magazines
SIG 516 - Standard issue assault rifle for Small Boat Division. Loaded with 30 rounds of 5.56×45mm NATO magazines.

History
The Hong Kong 'Water Police' had a role from the earliest days of British Hong Kong. The first actual vessel was acquired in 1846 – a sailing 'gun-boat' with a crew of 17, which was used for anti-piracy work. The vessel and its entire crew were lost in a typhoon two years later. By then the unit consisted of approximately 40 men and three boats. Each Constable in a six-man crew was armed with a pistol and a cutlass.

After World War II, as part of a major reshaping of the police force, the service was renamed 'Marine Police'.

See also
Special Duties Unit
Marine Department (Hong Kong)
Fire Services Department
Customs and Excise Department (Hong Kong)
Immigration Department
Government Flying Service
Water police
Coast Guard

References

External links

Police Transport and Vessels
Flag of the Marine Police
Flag of the Marine Police, according to the Shipping and Port Control Regulations, Shipping and Port Control Ordinance
New police vessels entering service
Boats of the Marine Police

Hong Kong Police Force
Sea rescue organizations
Maritime safety
Maritime law enforcement agencies